The AN-M8 HC Smoke Grenade designated as the Army/Navy Model 8 HC Smoke Grenade (AN-M8 Smoke HC) is a US military grenade used as a ground-to-ground obscuring or screening device or a ground-to-air signaling or target-marking device.

History
Developed in the 1940s, using a sheet-steel cylinder body that can emit a dense cloud of white smoke that would last from 105 to 150 seconds.

The AN-M8 was used extensively by American or other allied forces throughout World War II to the 1990s. As of the September 2000 version of FM 3-23.30 Grenades and Pyrotechnic Signals, the AN/M8 was listed as obsolete.

Details
It is used for smoke screening, target marking, and signalling, although the M18 colored smoke grenades are mainly used for the latter.

Warning
The AN-M8 hand grenade produces harmful hydrochloric fumes that irritates the eyes, throat, and lungs. It should not be used in closed-in areas unless the users are wearing protective masks.
With both the AN-M8 and AN M18, there is danger of starting a fire if it is used in a dry area. The steel casing can be heated by the hot chemical reaction, which can ignite flammable materials (like trash or dry vegetation) nearby.

Field Instructional Use
When employing the M18 or AN-M8 HC hand grenade, it may be desirable to use one of these grenades without the fuze. To do this, the following procedure should be used in combat only: 
Remove the tape from grenade bottom to expose the filler.
Remove the fuze by unscrewing it from the grenade.
Ignite starter mixture with open flame.
Immediately throw the grenade to avoid burn injury.

Toxicity 
The HC smoke of the M8 is more toxic than that of the M18 grenade. The fumes comprise an acidic smoke of zinc chloride (ZnCl2), which produces hydrochloric acid on contact with water.

See also
 AN-M18 colored smoke grenades
M83 White Smoke Grenade

References 

Smoke grenades
Hand grenades of the United States